Shorea robusta seed oil is an edible oil extracted from the seeds of Shorea robusta. Shorea robusta is known as the Sal tree in India. Sal is indigenous to India and occurs in two main regions separated by the Gangetic Plain, namely the northern and central Indian regions. The plant belongs to the Dipterocarpaceae botanical family.

Common name in Indian languages

Common name: Sal
Hindi:( साल) Sal, Salwa, Sakhu, Sakher
Marathi: sal, guggilu, rala, sajara
+Telugu: Guggilamu
Tamil: attam, venkungiliyam, kungiliyam
Malayalam: kaimaruthu, kungiliyam, maramaram
Kannada: ashvakarna, asina, asu, bile-bhogimara
Bengali: Sal
Oriya: sala
Urdu: Ral, Safed dammar
Assamese: Sal, Hal
Sanskrit: agnivallabha, ashvakarna, ashvakarnika

Tree

The trunk is clean, straight and cylindrical, often bearing epicormic branches. The crown is spreading and spherical. The bark is dark brown and thick, with longitudinal fissures deep in poles, becoming shallow in mature trees, and provides effective fire protection. The tree develops a long taproot at a young age. The tree grows at  altitude. S. robusta flourishes best in deep, well-drained, moist, slightly acid, sandy to clayey soils. It does not tolerate waterlogging. The most favourable soil is a moist sandy loam with good subsoil drainage. Soil moisture is essential.

New leaves are reddish, soon becoming delicate green.

Flowers are yellowish-white, arranged in large terminal or axillary racemose panicles.

Fruit content is 66.4% kernel and pod, 33.6% is shell and calyx. The fruits generally ripen in May.

The seed contains 14-15% fat. It has calyx and wings. The de-winged seeds contain a thin, brittle seed pod. The kernel has 5 segments covering the embryo.  of seeds give  of kernel. The seeds are 10.8% water, 8% protein, 62.7% carbohydrate, 14.8% oil, 1.4% fiber and 2.3% ash.

Habitat
This species ranges south of the Himalaya, from Myanmar in the east to Nepal, India and Bangladesh. The tree is widely distributed in tropical regions and covers about 13.3% of the forested area in the country. Sal (Shorea robusta) tree occurs either gregariously or mixed with other trees in Himalayan foot hills and central India. In the Himalayan foothill belt it extends up to Assam valley (including Mefghalaya and Tripura) in the east to foothills of north-west Bengal, Uttar Pradesh, Uttaranchal, Kangra region of Himachala Pradesh. The Gangetic Plain separate the Himalayan foothill from the central Indian belt.

Seed collection-oil extraction
Sal is a major means of survival for forest dwellers in the Central Indian states of Orissa, Chhattisgarh and Madhya Pradesh. These three states include the country's largest sal belt. Sal forest covers about 45% of their forested areas. Across these three states some 20-30 million forest dwellers depend on collection of sal seeds, leaves and resins. The proper storage of seeds before processing is crucial. Excess moisture (>6-8%) damages oil quality via Hydrolysis in the seed fat, with resulting high free fatty acid oil output.

Sal fat is extracted via three methods. Traditionally fat is extracted by water rendering. The second, mechanical system is extraction by oil expeller and rotary mills. The third method is via solvent extraction in which the seed is pressed as flakes first in a flaker mill and exposed to solvent extraction.

Characteristics
The extracted crude sal oil/fat is greenish-brown and has a characteristic odour. Due to the presence of more saturated fatty acids, it is solid at room temperature. Because of this, it is known as sal fat or sal butter. The oil is used as cooking oil after refining. The oil contains 35-45% stearic acid, an 18-carbon saturated fatty acid, and 40-45% oleic acid, which is a mono unsaturated fatty acid, with 18 carbon atoms. The refined oil is used as substitute for cocoa butter in chocolate manufacturing.

Applications 

Sal oil or butter is used for cooking locally and used for soap up to 30%. Refined, modified fat is a substitute for cocoa butter and used in confectionery industry. Sal butter is used in the manufacturing of edible ghee (vanaspati), paints and pigments, lubricants, auto oil, etc.

See also
Shorea robusta

References

External links
https://web.archive.org/web/20130211065905/http://jhamfcofed.com/resources/sal_seed.htm
http://upscguide.com/content/timber-trees-india.

Cooking oils
Vegetable oils